Herrischried is a municipality in the district of Waldshut in Baden-Württemberg in Germany.

References

Baden
Waldshut (district)
Hotzenwald